The Fleet Cup (Turkish: Donanma Kupası) was a football competition in Turkey. It was played in 1982 and between 1986. Fenerbahçe holds the record for most trophies in this competition with 4 titles to its name.

Champions

Titles

References

Defunct football cup competitions in Turkey
1982 establishments in Turkey
1986 disestablishments in Turkey
Recurring sporting events established in 1982
Recurring events disestablished in 1986